Rostam County is in Fars province, Iran. The capital of the county is the city of Masiri. At the 2006 census, the region's population (as Rostam District of Mamasani County) was 45,377 in 9,134 households. The following census in 2011 counted 46,851 people in 11,902 households, by which time the district had been separated from the county to form Rostam County. At the 2016 census, the county's population was 44,386 in 12,668 households.

Administrative divisions

The population history and structural changes of Rostam County's administrative divisions over three consecutive censuses are shown in the following table. The latest census shows two districts, four rural districts, and two cities.

References

 

Counties of Fars Province